Liolaemus tirantii is a species of lizard in the family Iguanidae.  It is from Argentina.

References

tirantii
Lizards of South America
Reptiles of Argentina
Endemic fauna of Argentina
Reptiles described in 2017
Taxa named by Luciano Javier Ávila
Taxa named by Jack W. Sites Jr.
Taxa named by Mariana Morando